Shivani Kataria (born 27 September 1997) is an Indian swimmer. She competes in the women's 200m freestyle. She represented India at 2016 Summer Olympics . She has also won many medals at South Asian Games and Asian Age Group Championship .

Early life 
Shivani was born in Haryana, and raised in Gurugram where she attended DAV Public School. She started swimming at 6 at a summer camp at Baba Gang Nath Swimming Centre near her house. Her parents were supportive. She started competing in district level events under her first coach Mr. Yadav and won the bronze medal at CBSE nationals in Gujarat. In 2012, she decided to become a professional swimmer and started swimming two hours in the morning and two in the evening along with an hour of core exercises during the day.

Career 
Shivani finished sixth in the 200m freestyle at the 2013 Asian Youth Championships and won a gold medal at the 2016 South Asian Games. In 2015, she trained for a year at the FINA camp at Thyanpura in Phuket, Thailand, where she swam three times a day. She clocked 2:04:00 in that camp and was closest to a time slot level, called the B Cut.

2016 Summer Olympics 
Shivani was selected as India's wildcard entry for the Rio Olympics by the Swimming Federation of India (SFI), making her the first Indian women to swim in the Summer Olympics since 2004 in Athens. She competed at the 2016 Summer Olympics in the women's 200 metre freestyle event; her time of 2:09.30 in the heats did not qualify her for the semifinals. She holds most of India's national records. Shivani sees the 2016 Olympics qualification more as a learning curve which will strengthen her chances in the 2020 Olympic.

References

External links
 

1997 births
Living people
Indian female swimmers
Olympic swimmers of India
Swimmers at the 2016 Summer Olympics
21st-century Indian women
21st-century Indian people
Sportswomen from Haryana
Swimmers from Haryana
South Asian Games gold medalists for India
South Asian Games silver medalists for India
South Asian Games bronze medalists for India
South Asian Games medalists in swimming